Lemeza (Lämäźe) is a rural locality (a village) in Ulu-Telyaksky Selsoviet, Iglinsky District, Bashkortostan, Russia. The population was 24 as of 2010. There is 1 street.

Geography 
Lemeza is located 27 km east of Iglino (the district's administrative centre) by road.

References 

Rural localities in Iglinsky District